Brainwash is an EP record by Spongehead, released on April 26, 1994, by Triple X Records.

Track listing

Personnel 
Adapted from the Brainwash liner notes.

Spongehead
 David Henderson – tenor saxophone, bass guitar
 Doug Henderson – guitar, bass guitar, vocals, Vox organ, production, engineering
 Mark Kirby – drums, Vox organ

Production and additional personnel
 Phill Brown – mastering
 Madeleine – photography, design
 John Nowlin – photography, design
 Dave Sardy – production, engineering
 Guy Yarden – violin (6)

Release history

References 

1994 EPs
Albums produced by Doug Henderson (musician)
Albums produced by Dave Sardy
Spongehead albums
Triple X Records EPs